Cedar Township is one of twenty-one townships in Knox County, Illinois, USA.  As of the 2010 census, its population was 3,270 and it contained 1,487 housing units.  Its name was changed from Cherry Grove Township on June 8, 1853.

Geography

Cities, towns, villages
 Abingdon (north three-quarters)

Unincorporated towns
 Saluda at 
(This list is based on USGS data and may include former settlements.)

Cemeteries
The township contains these three cemeteries: Abingdon, Brush Creek and Cherry Grove.

Airports and landing strips
 Malone Landing Strip

Demographics

School districts
 Abingdon Community Unit School District 217
 Galesburg Community Unit School District 205
 Knoxville Community Unit School District 202

Political districts
 Illinois's 17th congressional district
 State House District 74
 State Senate District 37

References
 
 United States Census Bureau 2009 TIGER/Line Shapefiles
 United States National Atlas

External links
 City-Data.com
 Illinois State Archives
 Township Officials of Illinois

Townships in Knox County, Illinois
Galesburg, Illinois micropolitan area
Townships in Illinois